Lerna is a former municipality in Argolis, Peloponnese, Greece. Since the 2011 local government reform it is part of the municipality Argos-Mykines, of which it is a municipal unit. The municipal unit has an area of 84.285 km2. The seat of the municipality was Myloi. Population 2,319 (2011).

Historical population

References

Populated places in Argolis